5R may refer to :
 Yaesu VX-5R, an ultra-compact amateur radio transceiver
 Karthago Airlines IATA designator
 Madagascar aircraft registration code
 A standard consumer print size for photographs. See Standard photographic print sizes.
5R, the production code for the 1980 Doctor Who serial Full Circle
5R Fulton Rapid, a San Francisco bus line

See also
R5 (disambiguation)